Wanzhou District is Chongqing's second most populated urban core area on the upper reaches of the Three Gorges of the Yangtze River in China. It is currently governed as a district of Chongqing Municipality, bordering Sichuan to the northwest and Hubei to the southeast. It was formerly known as Wanxian or Wan County. Prior to Chongqing's formation as a direct-controlled municipality, Wanzhou was part of Sichuan province.

"Wanzhou" literally means "myriad-prefecture", where "a myriad rivers converge and a myriad traders gather". Due to the construction of the Three Gorges Dam, 47% of Wanzhou's old urban area was submerged and had to be relocated.

History

The district was part of Wanxian Prefecture, then the prefectural Wanxian City. It was renamed to Wanzhou in late 1990s.

It was part of Quren County of Ba Commandery in the Qin Dynasty. It became Yangqu County in 216 (the Eastern Han Dynasty). In 230 (the Shu-Han Kingdom), it was renamed to Nanpu; in 553 (the Western Wei dynasty), to Yuquan; in 557 (Northern Zhou Dynasty), to Anxiang; in 584, to Wanchuan; and in 598 (Sui Dynasty), to Nanpu again.

In 619 (Tang Dynasty), Nanpu Commandery was established. In 625, the name was changed to Pu Prefecture, and in 634, to Wan Prefecture. In 1373 (Yuan Dynasty), Wan was demoted to a county.

In the 19th century, it was known in English as Wanhsien and Wan County. In 1935, it became Wanxian Prefecture. On December 12, 1992, the State Council abolished Wanxian Prefecture and its subordinate Wanxian City and created the prefecture-level Wanxian City, which administered the districts of Longbao, Tiancheng, Wuqiao and the counties of Kai, Zhong, Liangping, Yunyang, Fengjie, Wushan, Wuxi, and Chengkou.

The entire Wanxian City was merged into Chongqing on December 20, 1997. The merge necessitated the abolishment of Wanxian City and creation of Wanxian District and Wanxian Migration Development Area. Wanxian City's three districts were converted to administrative committees (abbreviated ) of Wanxian District. The migration development area included the counties formerly in Wanxian City, except Liangping and Chengkou, which were administered by Chongqing directly.

On May 22, 1998, the State Council approved that the two areas named Wanxian were both renamed to Wanzhou. The migration development area later dissolved and its counties were directly controlled by Chongqing. On July 19, 2000, the district's administrative committees were changed to migration development areas.

Sports

The 26,000-capacity Wanzhou Pailou Sports Stadium is located in Wanzhou. It is used mostly for association football and also sometimes for athletics. One stand is covered with a roof.

Geography and climate
Wanzhou spans 30°24′−31°14′ N latitude and 107°55′−108°53′ E longitude, and is situated at the eastern edge of the Sichuan Basin. Bordering county-level divisions:

Yunyang Countyeast
Shizhu Countysouth
Lichuan, Hubeisouth
Zhong Countywest
Liangping Countywest
Kaijiang County, Sichuannorth
Kai Countynorth

Similar to the city proper of Chongqing, Wanzhou has a monsoon-humid subtropical climate (Köppen Cwa) with short, mild winters, and very hot, humid summers, and is in fact on average  warmer during the day.

Climate

Subdivisions
The 4 primary subdivisions were 3 migration development areas (Longbao, Tiancheng, Wuqiao) and Jiangnan New District. Now Wanzhou is subdivided into 92 township divisions are 16 sub-districts, 33 towns, and 43 townships (see Administrative divisions of the People's Republic of China#Levels). In 2000, the district included 32 towns, 45 townships, 14 sub-districts, and 1277 neighborhood and village committees.

Colleges and universities

Chongqing Three Gorges University
 Chongqing Three Gorges Medical College
 Chongqing Three Gorges Polytechnic College
 Chongqing Information Technology College
 Chongqing Preschool Education College
 Chongqing Vocational Institute of Safety & Technology
 Chongqing Science And Technology Career Academy

Transport
Wanzhou has three Yangtze River crossings. It has two railway stations: Wanzhou North offers high-speed service and Wanzhou offers infrequent conventional services.
China National Highway 318
Wanzhou Wuqiao Airport

Gallery

References

External links

 Official site (in Simplified Chinese)
 Wanxian Travel

Districts of Chongqing